Six ships of the Royal Navy have borne the name HMS Lee:

 was an 8-gun sloop serving on the Canadian Lakes in 1776.
 was an 8-gun galley, previously named Adder, purchased in 1780 and sold in 1784. 
 was a 20-gun sixth rate launched in 1814 and broken up in 1822.
 was a wooden screw gunboat launched in 1857 and sunk in action in 1859.
 was a  wooden screw gunvessel launched in 1860 and broken up in 1875.
 was a destroyer launched in 1899, classified as a C-class destroyer in 1913 and wrecked in 1909.

Royal Navy ship names